A duvet day is a formal allowance of time off given by some employers, most commonly in the United Kingdom and United States. It differs from holiday allowance in that no prior notice is needed. Employees receive an allocation of days where if they do not want to go to work for any reason they can use a duvet day. The name is a reference to the item of bedding.

Duvet days were originally given to employees by UK company August One Communications in 1997, and the idea has grown in popularity as some companies aim to address the changing work-life climate where people work longer hours. It can be stipulated formally in a contract of employment and is considered part of the remunerations package along with holiday allowance. The term has also since become used by people to reference taking a day off work for no normally accepted reason (such as mild sickness, grievance or holiday) even if they have no official duvet day entitlement with their employer.

In the Indian subcontinent, this is historically called a casual leave. Employees usually are sanctioned a fixed number of days off (usually 12 per year for government and 8-12 for private employees). These days can be taken with or without planning. Since these leave days could not be accumulated or carried over into the next year, they would expire at the year end. This created a tendency to utilize all the left over casual leave in November and December. The Indian casual leave has been around for more than 50 years.

References

Labour law
Holidays
Leave of absence